NEWS is the fifth studio album by a Japanese boy band, NEWS released on July 17, 2013. The album was released in limited edition A, limited edition B and regular edition. The limited edition A comes with bonus DVD, limited edition B comes with 32-page booklet and 1 bonus CD which includes 4 solo tracks and regular edition comes with 1 bonus track.

Album information 
After the departure of two members in 2011, Johnny’s group NEWS continued their activities as a quartet. The new NEWS now finally releasing their new self-titled full-length album NEWS is their first album in almost three years.

Release history

References

2013 albums
News (band) albums